Open end or Open-end may refer to:

 Open end (dominoes), a term used in the game of dominoes
 Open End (sculpture), an abstract public art sculpture by Clement Meadmore
 Open-end fund, a collective investment scheme that can issue and redeem shares at any time
 Open-end spinning, a technology for creating yarn without using a spindle
 Open-end wrench, a one-piece wrench with a U-shaped opening that grips two opposite faces of the bolt or nut

Media
 Open End (1958–1966), the original title of the television series The David Susskind Show
 The open-endedness of such television programmes as Late Night Line-Up (1964-1972) and After Dark (1987-2003)
 Open End (2021), a German television discussion series hosted by Michel Friedman and broadcast by WELT

See also
 Open-ended (disambiguation)